The Hankyu Hai (Japanese 阪急杯) is a Grade 3 horse race for Thoroughbreds aged four and over, run in February over a distance of 1400 metres on turf at Hanshin Racecourse. The race serves as a trial for the Takamatsunomiya Kinen.

The Hankyu Hai was first run in 1957 and has held Grade 3 status since 1984. The race was run at Kyoto Racecourse in 1959, 1966, 1969, 1991 and 1995. It was run over a variety of distances before being run over 1400 metres for the first time in 1981: it was run over 1200 metres from 1996 to 2005.

Winners since 2000

Earlier winners

 1984 - Gouache Out
 1985 - Shadai Sophia
 1986 - Long Hayabusa
 1987 - St Caesar
 1988 - Sankin Hayate
 1989 - Horino Raiden
 1990 - Senryo Yakusha
 1991 - Jo Roaring
 1992 - Hokusei Ciboulette
 1993 - Legacy Field
 1994 - Gold Mountain
 1995 - Bodyguard
 1996 - Towa Winner
 1997 - Shinko Forest
 1998 - Masa Lucky
 1999 - Kyoei March

See also
 Horse racing in Japan
 List of Japanese flat horse races

References

Turf races in Japan